A Kiss Before Dying is a 1991 American romantic thriller film directed by James Dearden, and based on Ira Levin's 1953 novel of the same name, which won the 1954 Edgar Award for Best First Novel. The drama features Matt Dillon, Sean Young, Max von Sydow, and Diane Ladd. The story had been previously adapted under the same name in 1956.

Plot 
A copper refinery owned by Thor Carlsson ships metal on Carlsson Copper trains, watched by a young boy from his home beside the tracks.

Decades later in 1987, during a class at the University of Pennsylvania, Dorothy Carlsson absent-mindedly doodles her wedding. Later, changing into a formal outfit, she runs into her friend Patricia Farren, but denies she is meeting her "mystery man".

Dorothy meets Jonathan Corliss at City Hall. Finding the marriage license bureau closed for lunch, they discuss how Dorothy's father would disown her if he knew what she was doing. Convincing Dorothy to wait on the building's roof, they are seated together on the parapet. At first, Dorothy is hesitant, but Jonathan insists they sit there. Saying "I'm sorry, Dorothy. You have only yourself to blame," Jonathan suddenly pushes her over the edge, taking the expensive cigarette lighter that she had left behind. Her body crashes through the glass skylight, and falls to the marble floor below. Returning downstairs, and after mailing a letter in the lobby, he calmly walks past Dorothy's shattered body as a crowd gathers.

Thor and his daughter Ellen, Dorothy's twin, are shocked to learn Dorothy was pregnant and read what appears to be her suicide note, mailed the day she died. Ellen cannot believe her sister would kill herself. Jonathan returns to his working-class home in Pittsburgh with clippings about the Carlsson family, particularly the suicides of Thor's wife and son. Promising his mother to make something of his life, Jonathan hitchhikes to New York, accepting a ride from Jay Faraday, a bohemian drifter whose parents died on Korean Air Lines Flight 007.

Four months later, Ellen is working at Castle House, a shelter and outreach program. Investigating Dorothy's death, Ellen meets Detective Dan Corelli in Philadelphia. Showing him the drawing Dorothy made of her wedding, dated the day of her death, and noting she died outside the marriage license bureau, Ellen suggests Dorothy was lured with the promise of marriage and killed by a boyfriend, but Corelli dismisses her theory.

Ellen goes to campus, where Patricia reveals Dorothy was dating someone. Ellen finds Dorothy's ex-boyfriend Tommy Roussell, who explains he had a breakdown after his relationship with Dorothy and was out of school when she died. Remembering she then dated another student, Tommy takes Ellen to his apartment to show her the man's yearbook photo. Ellen waits outside, while Jonathan stalks her in his car. Tommy finds Jonathan's photo, but Jonathan strangles him, types a suicide note on Tommy's computer admitting to killing Dorothy, and stages his suicide. Ellen is left convinced that Tommy killed Dorothy.

Ellen returns home to New York, and her boyfriend arrives – Jonathan, who has assumed Jay Faraday's identity. Their relationship develops, working together at Castle House, and "Jay" impresses Thor with his ambition. Ellen and Jay marry, and he joins Carlsson Copper. Intercepting a call from Patricia, who is heading to New York after remembering the identity of Dorothy's boyfriend, Jay arranges for Patricia to wait in her hotel room for a call from Ellen the next day. There, he strangles Patricia, dismembering her in the bathtub and stuffing her corpse in a suitcase before going out on a date with Ellen. After driving her home, he dumps the suitcase in the East River.

A police detective investigating Patricia's disappearance informs Ellen that her name and number were in Patricia's diary. Suspicious, Ellen confirms with Tommy's parents that he was institutionalized at the time of Dorothy's death. Ellen asks Corelli to reopen the investigation, with no results.

At a bar with Ellen, Jay is recognized as Jonathan Corliss by an acquaintance from Philadelphia but insists he is mistaken, eventually hitting him. Unsettled, Ellen digs up a UPenn yearbook and finds a picture of Jonathan. She tracks down Jonathan's mother, who says that Jonathan had committed suicide three years earlier, though his body was never found. Visiting her in the house where he grew up, Ellen learns about his childhood. His mother leaves, and Ellen sneaks inside to search Jonathan's room, finding his suitcase of clippings about her family and her sister's lighter. Jonathan, having followed her, confesses that he killed Faraday and assumed his identity. He schemed to marry into the Carlsson family, but Dorothy's unplanned pregnancy meant she would be disinherited. Jonathan prepares to strangle Ellen, who escapes from the house to the train tracks. Giving chase, Jonathan is run over by a Carlsson train, at the same spot he watched the trains pass as a child.

Cast 

 Matt Dillon as Jonathan Corliss
 Sean Young as Ellen/Dorothy Carlsson
 Max von Sydow as Thor Carlsson
 Diane Ladd as Mrs. Corliss
 James Russo as Dan Corelli
 Ben Browder as Tommy Roussell
 Martha Gehman as Patricia Farren
 Jim Fyfe as Terry Dieter
 Lachele Carl as Reporter
 Shane Rimmer as Commissioner Malley
 Adam Horovitz as Jay Faraday

Production 
The producers of A Kiss Before Dying wanted River Phoenix to play Jonathan. They approached him several times for the role, and kept increasing their offers, but he didn't feel a connection to the material and felt he was unsuitable to play the part, so he repeatedly turned it down and Matt Dillon was then cast. Diane Lane and Penelope Ann Miller were each considered for the dual roles of Ellen and Dorothy, but both rejected it. Bridget Fonda was originally cast, but quit the production due to scheduling conflicts and Sean Young signed on to replace her.

Locations 

The film was primarily shot in Great Britain, with secondary locations in the United States.

British locations include: Port Talbot steelworks, Cardiff, South Glamorgan, Wales, (opening sequence at "Abbey Coke Ovens area of Port Talbot Steel works, with Main Pumphouse, cooling tower and water storage towers in the background"); Brocket Hall, Welwyn Garden City, Hertfordshire, England; Gaddesden Place, Hemel Hempstead, Hertfordshire, England; Lee International Studios, Shepperton, Surrey, England; and London, England.

United States: Charlottesville, Virginia; New York City; and Philadelphia, Pennsylvania.

Distribution 
The film opened in wide release on 26 April 1991 in the United States. In England it opened on 14 June 1991.

The box-office receipts were poor. The first week's gross was $4,348,165 and the total receipts for the four-week run were $14,478,720. The film was in wide release for thirty-one days.

In its widest release the film was featured in 1,546 theatres across the country.

Reception

Critical response 
Chicago Sun-Times film critic Roger Ebert praised the direction of the picture and Matt Dillon's work, writing, "This is Matt Dillon's first film since Drugstore Cowboy, and demonstrates again that he is one of the best actors working in movies. He possesses the secret of not giving too much, of not trying so hard that we're distracted by his performance... [and director] Dearden helps it work because he doesn't press his point."

Rolling Stones Peter Travers was not as kind in his review of this film, especially when compared to the 1956 original. He blasts the screenplay and the direction of the film. He wrote: "Though Dearden gets the surface right – the movie looks sleek – he skimps on characterization... [and] Dearden's script fails to provide the raw material that would let him go beyond the stereotype... Dearden merely walks the cast through a gauntlet of film noir cliches."

The review aggregator Rotten Tomatoes reported that 36% of critics gave the film a positive review, based on 14 reviews. Audiences polled by CinemaScore gave the film an average grade of "C+" on an A+ to F scale.

Awards 
Golden Raspberry Awards
 Worst Actress, Sean Young as Ellen Carlsson; 1991.
 Worst Supporting Actress, Sean Young as Dorothy Carlsson; 1991.

Comparisons to novel 
While leaving Corliss' character basically unchanged (other than renaming him Jonathan), the film drastically changed the story of the novel. In the film, Corliss fakes his own suicide after murdering Dorothy, and re-emerges as "Jay Faraday" to woo and marry Dorothy's sister, Ellen. In the novel, Corliss does not take on a new identity. Ellen's other sister, Marion, does not appear in either film version of the story. The "Gant" character in the novel was rewritten as a homicide detective who had investigated Dorothy's death. In this film, Corliss meets his end while attempting to kill Ellen after she discovers who he really is; while chasing her down, and for the sake of irony, he is run over by one of her father's trains.

Adaptation
Baazigar (Translation: Gambler), a 1993 Indian crime thriller film directed by Abbas–Mustan and starring Shah Rukh Khan, Kajol and Shilpa Shetty in the lead roles.

References

External links 
 
 
 
 
 
 A Kiss Before Dying information site at DVD Beaver (includes images)
 

1991 films
1990s erotic thriller films
American erotic thriller films
British erotic thriller films
Films scored by Howard Shore
Films about identity theft
Films based on American novels
Films based on crime novels
Films based on works by Ira Levin
Films directed by James Dearden
Films set in 1987
Films set in 1990
Films set in New York City
Films set in Philadelphia
Films set in Pittsburgh
Films set in Virginia
Golden Raspberry Award winning films
American neo-noir films
Universal Pictures films
1990s English-language films
1990s American films
1990s British films